Ajdut Israel  is a synagogue in Punta del Este, Uruguay. 

 List of synagogues in Uruguay

References

External links
 Beit Jabad Uruguay  

Ashkenazi Jewish culture in Uruguay
 synagogues
Synagogues in Maldonado Department
Chabad in South America
Buildings and structures in Punta del Este
Orthodox Judaism in Uruguay